Steve Darcis was the defending champion but chose not to defend his title.

Reilly Opelka won the title after defeating Grégoire Barrère 6–7(5–7), 6–4, 7–5 in the final.

Seeds

Draw

Finals

Top half

Bottom half

External Links
Main Draw
Qualifying Draw

BNP Paribas Primrose Bordeaux - Singles
2018 Singles